Barbara Bouchet (born  Bärbel Gutscher; 15 August 1943) is a German-American actress and entrepreneur who lives and works in Italy.
 
She has acted in more than 80 films and television episodes and founded a production company that has produced fitness videos and books. She also owns and operates a fitness studio. She appeared in Casino Royale (1967) as Miss Moneypenny, in Don't Torture a Duckling (1972) as Patrizia, in Sweet Charity (1969) as Ursula, in The Red Queen Kills Seven Times (1972) as Kitty Wildenbrück, in Caliber 9 (1972) as Nelly Bordon, in The Scarlet and The Black (1983) as Minna Kappler, and in Martin Scorsese's Gangs of New York (2002) as Mrs. Schermerhorn.

Early life
Bärbel Gutscher was born in Reichenberg,  Sudetenland, a part of Czechoslovakia that was ceded to National Socialist  Germany and is today part of the Czech Republic. She had four siblings. Her father, Fritz, was a photographer, and her mother, Ingrid, was an actress.

After World War II, her family was placed in a resettlement camp in the American occupation zone in Germany. They were granted permission to emigrate to the United States under the humanitarian provisions of the Displaced Persons Act of 1948.

After arriving in the United States, the family lived in Five Points, California on the west side of the Central Valley and eventually settled in San Francisco, where Gutscher was raised. During the early 1960s San Francisco Bay Area television station KPIX-TV ran a show named The KPIX Dance Party and offered Gutscher the opportunity to become a member of the show's dance group.

These were teenage dancers who danced live to the hit songs of the day and became locally known in their own right by being on television six days per week. She was on the show from 1959 until 1962, then moved to Hollywood to get into the film industry, changing her Germanic sounding name to the French sounding Barbara Bouchet.

Career

Bouchet began her career modelling for magazine covers and appearing in television commercials, before eventually becoming an actress. Her first acting role was a minor part in What a Way to Go! (1964), which led to a series of other roles in the 1960s. She appeared in the films John Goldfarb, Please Come Home (1964), In Harm's Way (1964), and Agent for H.A.R.M. (1966).

She appeared, semi-nude, in two editions of Playboy magazine: May 1965 (stills from In Harm's Way) and February 1967 ("The Girls of Casino Royale").

In Casino Royale (1967), Bouchet played the role of Miss Moneypenny. She guest-starred in the Star Trek episode "By Any Other Name" (1968) as Kelinda, and appeared in the musical film Sweet Charity (1969) playing Ursula.

Tired of being typecast and unable to get starring roles in Hollywood, Bouchet moved to Italy in 1970 and began acting in Italian films, such as Black Belly of the Tarantula, Amuck!, The Man with Icy Eyes, The French Sex Murders, The Red Queen Kills Seven Times, Don't Torture a Duckling and Sex with a Smile.

She starred with Gregory Peck in The Scarlet and The Black (1983), a successful TV movie. In 1985, she established a production company and started to produce a successful series of fitness books and videos. In addition, Bouchet opened a fitness studio in Rome. In 2002, Bouchet appeared in Gangs of New York, playing Mrs. Schermerhorn.

Personal life
In 1974, Bouchet married Luigi Borghese, a producer, with whom she has two sons: Alessandro (b. 1976), a TV chef, and Massimiliano (b. 1989), a bartender. Her husband subsequently produced some of her later films. They separated in 2006, citing different aspirations.

Filmography

Films

Television

References

External links

Italica, a RAI website dedicated to the Italian post-World War II cinema
Barbara Bouchet fansite

1943 births
Living people
Actors from Liberec
American expatriates in Italy
American film actresses
American television actresses
German emigrants to the United States
Sudeten German people
Actresses from San Francisco
20th-century American actresses
21st-century American actresses